Eugene Kirwan (born 1 January 1993) is an Antiguan international footballer who plays club football for Five Islands FC as a midfielder.

Career
He made his international debut for Antigua and Barbuda in 2011.

References

1993 births
Living people
Antigua and Barbuda international footballers
Hoppers F.C. players
Antigua Barracuda F.C. players
Morvant Caledonia United players
Five Islands F.C. players
Antigua and Barbuda footballers
Antigua and Barbuda expatriate footballers
Expatriate footballers in Trinidad and Tobago
Antigua and Barbuda expatriate sportspeople in Trinidad and Tobago
USL Championship players
Association football midfielders
Antigua and Barbuda under-20 international footballers